France and Kiribati maintain official diplomatic relations, but no diplomatic presence on each other's territory; the French embassy in Suva is accredited to Kiribati.

History
In 1995, Kiribati briefly suspended its diplomatic relations with France in protest against French nuclear tests at Mururoa in French Polynesia.

France provides aid to Kiribati in various forms. French aid enabled the opening on nine school classes on Maiana in the early 2000s, and France also recently assisted Kiribati in evaluating its remaining phosphate resources on Banaba.

French exports to Kiribati were worth 24 million Euro in 2002.

Kiribati also allows French vessels to fish in its waters.

I-Kiribati President Anote Tong paid a State visit to Paris in June 2006 to attend a France-Oceania multilateral summit. The summit aimed at "strengthening French-Pacific relations and regional cooperation" in economic, political, environmental and security fields.

Sources
 French Foreign Affairs Ministry

See also 
 Foreign relations of France 
 Foreign relations of Kiribati

Notes and references 

Bilateral relations of Kiribati
Kiribati